Cullinane College is an integrated, Co-Educational Secondary school in Whanganui, New Zealand for students in Year 9 to Year 13. Cullinane College was founded in 2003, through the combining of Sacred Heart College (founded in 1880 and operated by the Sisters of St Joseph of Nazareth) and St Augustines College  (founded in 1944 and operated by the priests and brothers of the Society of Mary). The college is named after: Sister Vincent Cullinane RSJ and Sister Cuthbert Cullinane RSJ (both important teachers at Sacred Heart College); Father John Cullinane SM (an important teacher at St Augustine's College); and Bishop Peter James Cullinane, first Bishop of Palmerston North (1980-2012). The Bishop of Palmerston North is the proprietor of the college.

Sports Exchange 
The college has an annual junior (Year 9, 10 and occasionally Year 11) sports exchange with Awatapu College in Palmerston North, generally competing in netball, basketball and rugby union. The exchange has been running as long as Cullinane's existence.

Principals
 Justin Harper ( - July 2022)
 Lida Penn-Reina (Acting) (July 2022 - present)

Notes

Educational institutions established in 2003
Schools in Whanganui
Catholic secondary schools in New Zealand
2003 establishments in New Zealand
Secondary schools in Manawatū-Whanganui